Boeomimetes is a genus of beetles in the family Carabidae, containing the following species:

 Boeomimetes atratus Peringuey, 1896
 Boeomimetes confusus Basilewsky, 1948
 Boeomimetes ephippium Boheman, 1946
 Boeomimetes jeanneli Basilewsky, 1946

References

Harpalinae